The College of San Fernando de México was a Roman Catholic Franciscan missionary college, or seminary (Colegio Apostólico), founded in Spanish colonial Mexico City by the Franciscan Order of Friars Minor on October 15, 1734.

The institution was established to provide specific training for priests who were to work among the indigenous populations within the Spanish colonial Viceroyalty of New Spain, located in present-day Mexico and the southwestern United States.

Notable alumni
 Gregório Amúrrio
 Narciso Durán
 Vicente Fustér
 Luís Jayme
 Pablo de Mugártegui
 Vicente Pascual Oliva
 Francisco Palóu
 Mariano Payéras
 Andrés Quintana
 José Bernardo Sánchez
 Vicente de Santa María
 José Francisco de Paula Señan
 Junípero Serra
 Buenaventura Sitjar

See also
 College of Guadalupe de Zacatecas
 College of Santa Cruz de Querétaro
 Franciscan Missions in the Sierra Gorda
 Spanish missions in Baja California
 Spanish missions in California

External links
JSTOR: The Americas, Vol. 5, No. 1 (Jul., 1948); pp. 48-60; "The Franciscan "Mission" to San Fernando College, Mexico, 1749"

Christianity in Mexico City
Colonial Mexico
Schools in Mexico City
Franciscan universities and colleges
Missions in Mexico
Catholic seminaries
Seminaries and theological colleges in Mexico
1730s establishments in Mexico
1734 establishments in the Spanish Empire
Junípero Serra